In the Middle Ages, a commandery (rarely commandry) was the smallest administrative division of the European landed properties of a military order. It was also the name of the house where the knights of the commandery lived. The word is also applied to the emoluments granted to a commander. They were the equivalent for those orders to a monastic grange. The knight in charge of a commandery was a commander.

Etymology
The word derives from French commanderie or commenderie, from mediaeval Latin commendaria or commenda, meaning "a trust or charge", originally one held in commendam. 

Originally, commandries were benefices, particularly in the Church, held in commendam. Mediaeval military orders adopted monastic organizational structures and commandries were divisions of the Order of Knights of St. John of Jerusalem,  and later the Order of Teutonic Knights and other knightly orders were organized along similar lines. The property of the order was divided into "priorates" (or priories), subdivided into "bailiwicks," which in turn were divided into "commanderies" or "commendæ"; these were placed in charge of a "commendator" or commander. The word is also applied to the emoluments granted to a commander of a military order of knights.

A commandry of the Teutonic Knights, each headed by a Komtur, was known as a Komturei or Kommende. The equivalents among the Knights Templar were "preceptor" and "preceptory". In 1540, the possessions in England of the Knights Hospitaller - the commanderies to which the English term first referred - were seized as crown property.

Usage

Modern
 A territory of the Venerable Order of Saint John
 A division of the Knights Templar, found within the York Rite of Freemasonry.
 A chapter of the Military Order of Foreign Wars.

Medieval
In the Near East and throughout Europe:
A territory of the Order of St John of Jerusalem, the Knights Hospitallers
A territory of the Order of Teutonic Knights and other orders
The Commandery, an historic building in the city of Worcester, England probably built by Knights Hospitallers

See also
Commandaria
In Commendam
Encomienda

References

Citations

Sources 

 

Feudalism in Europe
Orders of chivalry